Malik Azmani (born 20 January 1976) is a Dutch politician and former lawyer and civil servant. A member of the People's Party for Freedom and Democracy (VVD), which he led in the 2019 European Parliament election, he has served as a Member of the European Parliament (MEP) since then. Azmani was first elected to the House of Representatives in 2010.

Early life and career
A native of Heerenveen, Azmani is of Moroccan descent through his father and of Frisian descent through his mother. Before making a career at the Immigration and Naturalisation Service (IND), he studied law at the University of Groningen.

Political career

Career in national politics, 2010–2019
As a member of the People's Party for Freedom and Democracy, Azmani was a member of the House of Representatives from 2010 until 2019. He was also a member of the municipal council of Ommen from 2010 until 2014. In his political work, he primarily focused on migration and asylum, human trafficking and prostitution, as well as the Intelligence and Security Services Act (Wiv). Furthermore, from 2014 until August 2018, Azmani chaired the Committee on European Affairs in the House of Representatives.

In addition to his role in parliament, Azmani served as member of the Dutch delegation to the Parliamentary Assembly of the Council of Europe from 2013 until 2016.

Member of the European Parliament, 2019–present
In October 2018, Azmani was (unopposed) elected as the official leading candidate for the VVD in the European Parliament elections. 

Following the elections, Azmani was part of a cross-party working group in charge of drafting the European Parliament's four-year work program on rule of law, borders and migration. He has since been serving as deputy chairman of the Renew Europe group, under the leadership of chairman Dacian Cioloș. He is also a member of the Committee on Civil Liberties, Justice and Home Affairs and a substitute member of the Committee on Foreign Affairs. In 2021, he joined the parliament's working group on Frontex, led by Roberta Metsola. 

In addition to his committee assignments, Azmani is part of the Parliament's delegations for relations with the Maghreb countries and the Arab Maghreb Union as well as to the Parliamentary Assembly of the Union for the Mediterranean. He is also a member of the European Parliament Intergroup on LGBT Rights.

Since 2021, Azmani has been part of the Parliament's delegation to the Conference on the Future of Europe.

References 

  Parlement.com biography

External links 
  Malik Azmani personal website
  House of Representatives biography
  People's Party for Freedom and Democracy biography

1976 births
Living people
21st-century Dutch civil servants
21st-century Dutch lawyers
21st-century Dutch politicians
Dutch people of Frisian descent
Dutch people of Moroccan descent
Members of the House of Representatives (Netherlands)
MEPs for the Netherlands 2019–2024
Municipal councillors in Overijssel
People from Heerenveen
People from Ommen
People's Party for Freedom and Democracy politicians
University of Groningen alumni